Udel may refer to:

 a Russian feudal term for an appanage given to a younger son of the tsar or other male member of the imperial family 
 UDel, an abbreviation for the University of Delaware
 UDEL, Democratic Liberation Union (Unión Democrática de Liberación) of Nicaragua
 Udel (polymer), high-temperature polymer
 Joan Erbe Udel (1926–2014), U.S. artist

See also